The Women's junior road race of the 2012 UCI Road World Championships was a cycling event that took place on 21 September 2012 in Limburg, the Netherlands.

During the race Eva Mottet heavily crashed. She got medical help, and her father was with her as he was an UCI-official at the race. She suffered major injuries to her nose, and would never fully recover.

Final classification (top 10)

References 

Women's junior road race
UCI Road World Championships – Women's junior road race
2012 in women's road cycling